Močile may refer to:

 Močile, Slovenia, a village near Črnomelj, Slovenia
 Močile, Croatia, a village near Vrbovsko, Croatia